Louisiana Highway 619 (LA 619)  was a state highway that served St. Bernard Parish.  It spanned  in a west to east direction along the shore of Lake Borgne near what is now known as Old Shell Beach.

Route description
From the west, LA 619 began at an intersection with LA 46 in Shell Beach and proceeded eastward along the south shore of Lake Borgne.  It crossed a bridge over Doulluts Canal and reached its eastern terminus at a dead end shortly thereafter.
 
LA 619 was an undivided, two-lane highway for its entire length.

History
Prior to the construction of the Mississippi River-Gulf Outlet Canal (MRGO) in the early 1960s, LA 46 continued past its present terminus to the shore of Lake Borgne at the original Shell Beach.  Here, LA 619 began and proceeded to the east along the lake shore.  The construction of the MRGO caused what is now known as Old Shell Beach to be separated from the mainland.  As a result, LA 619 was abandoned, and LA 46 was shortened to its present terminus on the south side of the canal at the present Shell Beach.

LA 619 was designated as State Route C-1492 prior to the 1955 Louisiana Highway renumbering.

Major intersections

References

External links

La DOTD State, District, and Parish Maps
District 02
St. Bernard Parish (West Section)

0619
Transportation in St. Bernard Parish, Louisiana